A Wonderful Year! Guy Lombardo—and His Royal Canadians is a long-playing record album (LP) issued by Capitol Records in the United States in 1966.

Track listing
Side 1
King of the Road
Dear Heart
Alley Cat
Deep Purple
May the Bird of Paradise Fly Up Your Nose
A Taste Of Honey

Side 2
Spanish Eyes
My Kind of Town
Red Roses for a Blue Lady
The Shadow of Your Smile
Thunderball

References

1966 albums
Capitol Records albums
Guy Lombardo albums